Todo Depende de Ti (Everything Depends on You) is the title of a studio album released by banda music band La Arrolladora Banda El Limón on July 27, 2010. It is the follow-up to their number-one set on the Billboard Top Latin Albums chart Más Adelante.

Track listing
The track listing from Allmusic.

Charts

Weekly charts

Year-end charts

Sales and certifications

References

2010 albums
La Arrolladora Banda El Limón albums
Spanish-language albums
Disa Records albums